Amateur radio or ham radio is a hobby that is practised by over 16,000 licensed users in India.
Licences are granted by the Wireless and Planning and Coordination Wing (WPC), a branch of the Ministry of Communications and Information Technology. In addition, the WPC allocates frequency spectrum in India. The Indian Wireless Telegraphs (Amateur Service) Rules, 1978 lists five licence categories:

To obtain a licence, candidates must pass the Amateur Station Operator's Certificate examination conducted by the WPC. The examination consists of two 50-mark written sections: Radio theory and practice, Regulations; and a practical test consisting of a demonstration of Morse code proficiency in sending and receiving. After passing the examination, the candidate must clear a police interview. After clearance, the WPC grants the licence along with the user-chosen call sign. This procedure can take up to one year. This licence is valid for up to five years.

Each licence category has certain privileges allotted to it, including the allotment of frequencies, output power, and the emission modes. This article list the various frequencies allotted to various classes, and the corresponding emission modes and input DC power.

Allotted spectrum
The following table lists the frequencies that amateur radio operators in India can operate on.

External links 
 Government of India National Frequency Allocation Plan

Emission designations

The International Telecommunication Union uses an internationally agreed system for classifying radio frequency signals. Each Type of radio emission is classified according to its bandwidth, method of modulation, nature of the modulating signal, and Type of information transmitted on the carrier signal. It is based on characteristics of the signal, not on the transmitter used.

An emission designation is of the form BBBB 123 45, where BBBB is the bandwidth of the signal, 1 is a letter indicating the Type of modulation used, 2 is a digit representing the Type of modulating signal, 3 is a letter corresponding to the Type of information transmitted, 4 is a letter indicating the practical details of the transmitted information, and 5 is a letter that represents the method of multiplexing.  The 4 and 5 fields are optional. For example, an emission designation would appear read as 500H A3E, where 500H translates to 500 Hz, and A3E is the emission mode as permitted.

The WPC has authorized the following emission modes:

Licence categories

Two categories of amateur radio licence exist.

Restricted Grade
The Amateur Wireless Telegraph Station Licence, Restricted licence requires the same scores as the old term Grade II.The minimum age is 12 years. The licence allows the user to make radiotelegraphy (Morse code) and radiotelephony transmission in 12 frequency bands. The maximum power allowed is 100 W.

A Restricted Grade licence holder was previously authorized the use of radio telephony emission on frequency bands below 30 MHz on submission of proof that 100 contacts have been made with other amateur operators using CW (Morse code). This has now since changed with restricted license holders being allowed phone (SSB) bands with the only restriction being the PEP(peak envelope power) limited to 50 W. Now Morse Code is not necessary for this exam

General Grade 
The Amateur Station Operator's Licence, General Grade, requires a minimum of 50% in each section of the written examination, and 60% overall, and a demonstration of proficiency in sending and receiving Morse code at 8 words per minute (without errors for each). The minimum age is 12 years. The licence allows a user to make radiotelegraphy and radiotelephony transmission in 13 frequency bands. The maximum power allowed is 400 W. In addition, satellite communication, facsimile, and television modes are permitted.

See also
 Amateur radio in India
 Amateur radio frequency allocations
 Amateur Station Operator's Certificate
 Amateur radio licence categories in India

Notes

References

Frequency bands
India
Amateur radio bands
amateur radio
amateur radio
Amateur radio-related lists